Shipka may refer to:
 Shipka Monument, in Bulgaria
 Shipka (town), in Bulgaria
 Shipka Pass, in Bulgaria
 Shipka (stadium), in Asenovgrad, Bulgaria
 Shipka Saddle, in the Tangra Mountains, Livingston Island, Antarctica
 Shipka Valley, in the Tangra Mountains
 Arsenal Shipka, a kind of a submachine gun, produced in Bulgaria
 2530 Shipka, the name of an asteroid, an abandoned probe target
 Kiernan Shipka, American actress 
 Shipka (military base), a former Russian military base near Mukachevo, Ukraine
 A transliteration of Šipka, a cave in Czech Republic

See also